El Agustino is a district of the Lima Province in Peru. It is part of city of Lima.
Officially established as a district on January 6, 1965, the current mayor (alcalde) of El Agustino is Víctor Modesto Salcedo Ríos. The district's postal code is 10.

Geography
The district has a total land area of 12.54 km². Its administrative center is located 197 meters above sea level. Originally the boundary with Ate was marked by the Río Surco irrigation ditch, but in 1989 the eastern part of El Agustino (east of the El Agustino hill, which gave the district its name) broke away to form Santa Anita district with the Santa Anita section of Ate and surrounding areas.

Boundaries
 North: San Juan de Lurigancho and Lurigancho
 East: Ate and Santa Anita
 South: Ate, San Luis, La Victoria
 West: Downtown Lima

Demographics
According to a 2002 estimate by the INEI, the district has 166,177 inhabitants and a population density of 13,251.8 persons/km². In 1999, there were 32,910 households in the district.  It is the 25th most populated district in Lima.

References

External links
Municipalidad Distrital de El Agustino - El Agustino District Council Official Website 

Districts of Lima